Mark Seidenberg is Vilas Research Professor and Donald O. Hebb Professor of Psychology at the University of Wisconsin–Madison and a Senior Scientist at Haskins Laboratories.    He is a specialist in psycholinguistics, focusing specifically on the cognitive and neurological bases of language and reading.  Seidenberg received his Ph.D. from Columbia University under the mentorship of Thomas Bever and completed a postdoctoral fellowship at the Center for the Study of Reading at the University of Illinois.  He has held academic positions at McGill University, the University of Southern California, and since 2001 at the University of Wisconsin.  Seidenberg has published over a hundred scientific articles and is the author of Language at the Speed of Sight (2017). Seidenberg is married to fellow psychologist Maryellen MacDonald and has two children.

References

External links
MacDonald-Seidenberg Language and Cognitive Neuroscience Lab
Reading Matters: Connecting Science and Education

Year of birth missing (living people)
Living people
American cognitive neuroscientists
Haskins Laboratories scientists
Psycholinguists
Columbia University alumni
Academic staff of McGill University
University of Southern California faculty
University of Wisconsin–Madison faculty
Fellows of the Cognitive Science Society